The 43rd Yasar Dogu Tournament 2015, was a wrestling event held in Istanbul, Turkey between 28 and 29 March 2016.

This international tournament includes competition men's freestyle wrestling. This ranking tournament was held in honor of the two time Olympic Champion, Yaşar Doğu.

Medal table

Men's freestyle

Participating nations

See also
2021 Yasar Dogu Tournament
2020 Yasar Dogu Tournament
2019 Yasar Dogu Tournament
2018 Yasar Dogu Tournament
2017 Yasar Dogu Tournament
2016 Yasar Dogu Tournament
2014 Yasar Dogu Tournament
2013 Yasar Dogu Tournament
2012 Yasar Dogu Tournament
2011 Yasar Dogu Tournament

References 

Yasar Dogu 2015
2015 in sport wrestling
Sports competitions in Istanbul
Yaşar Doğu Tournament
International wrestling competitions hosted by Turkey